Hippo (minor planet designation: 426 Hippo) is a rather large main-belt asteroid. It was discovered by Auguste Charlois on August 25, 1897, in Nice.

References

External links
 
 

Background asteroids
Hippo
Hippo
F-type asteroids (Tholen)
18970825